This is a list of lakes of Mali, located completely or partially within the country's borders.

Lakes
 Lake Afou
 Lake Al Kamsi
 Lake Arala
 Lake Arandjéou
 Lake Arkaou
 Lake Arodout
 Lake Arona
 Lake Asi Taba
 Lake Bab el Eri
 Lake Bambiré
 Lake Bango
 Lake Baria
 Lake Bella
 Lake Bella Bambi
 Lake Bissoko
 Lake Bongoe
 Lake Bouari
 Lake Bouboutoussembou
 Lake Boudyou
 Lake Bouldi
 Lake Bouncham
 Lake Caytadié
 Lake Chamou
 Lake Chétégoula
 Lake Chibon
 Lake Dao
 Lake Daouat
 Lake Dara
 Lake Dargata
 Lake Daye
 Lake Dayé Dyesse
 Lake Débo
 Lake Débaré
 Lake Diataro
 Lake Dibanti
 Lake Didyéri
 Lake Dienko
 Lake Dingoganyé
 Lake Diori
 Lake Dioulgoul
 Lake Domino Tossokel
 Lake Doro Mare
 Lake Faguibine
 Lake Fatakara
 Lake Fatiha
 Lake Férem
 Lake Féto Maraboulé
 Lake Fobangou
 Lake Fonderé
 Lake Foroudougou
 Lake Gabi
 Lake Galigel
 Lake Galiya
 Lake Garia
 Lake Gassi
 Lake Gomaga
 Lake Gossi
 Lake Goua
 Lake Gougol
 Lake Gounako
 Lake Goundaka
 Lake Goussou
 Lake Guéou
 Lake I-n-Daroua
 Lake I-n-Tetouft
 Lake Ioussa
 Lake Kabara
 Lake Kâde
 Lake Kamne
 Lake Kan
 Lake Kandéfougou
 Lake Kangara
 Lake KanieKobo
 Lake Kanou
 Lake Karangara
 Lake Karsa
 Lake Kati
 Lake Koboro
 Lake Koguié
 Lake Kokorourou
 Lake Kokoungari
 Lake Kondiré
 Lake Kossokosso
 Lake Kouma
 Lake Koumana
 Lake Kounaguel

References

Mali
Lakes
Lakes